Allaston is a village in Gloucestershire, England, now forming part of the town of Lydney.

Allaston was mentioned in the Domesday Book, when it was part of Bledisloe Hundred.

External links
 
 

Villages in Gloucestershire
Lydney